The following lists events that happened during 1956 in Chile.

Incumbents
President of Chile: Carlos Ibáñez del Campo

Events

January
3 January – Foreign Minister Kaare Olsen Nielsen resigns to return to active service. José Serrano Palma is appointed successor.

February
14 February – 1956 Santiago rail crash

April
21 April – At least 38 people are killed when a bus plunges off a bridge near Calama.

June
10 June - At the FIFA congress held in Lisbon, Chile is chosen to host the 1962 FIFA World Cup.

August
2 August - The National Party (1956-1958) is created, product of the merger of the National Independent Movement, the National Agrarian Party and the Agrarian Labor Recoveryist Party.

Births
2 January – Andrés Chadwick, politician
2 January – Eduardo Fournier, footballer
24 January – Samy Benmayor, painter
7 February – Andrés Allamand, politician
19 July – Tomás Hirsch, politician
4 August – Alfredo Moreno Charme, politician
31 August – Cristián Campos, actor
23 September – Juan Núñez, tennis player
4 November – Alberto Espina, politician
8 December – Iván Moreira, politician
30 December – Claudia di Girolamo, actress

Deaths
6 August – Adelqui Migliar (b. 1891)

References 

 
Years of the 20th century in Chile
Chile